The Humber College Institute of Technology & Advanced Learning, commonly known as Humber College, is a public College of Applied Arts and Technology in Toronto, Ontario, Canada. Founded in 1967, Humber has two main campuses: the Humber North campus and the Lakeshore campus.

Programs
Humber offers more than 150 programs, including bachelor’s degree, diploma, certificate, post-graduate certificate and apprenticeship programs, across 40 fields of study.

Humber also provides academic advisors and resources, such as a career finder.

Beyond this, Humber College also provides Bridging (or Bridge Training) Programs for internationally trained professionals in the fields of engineering and information technology.
Humber serves 25,000 full-time and 57,000 part-time learners.

History
Humber was established in 1967 under its founding President, Gordon Wragg. The first new section of Humber College opened on Monday September 11, 1967 at James S. Bell Elementary School, a public school on Lake Shore Boulevard West. The Lakeshore Campus began with the addition of the manpower retraining programs on Queen Elizabeth Way in Etobicoke. In November 1968, North Campus was officially opened by Mayor Edward A. Horton of Etobicoke and Mayor Jack Moulton of York. In the early 1970s, student enrollment was rapidly increasing which led Humber to expand its business and technology programs at both the North and Lakeshore Campuses.  Humber College had the largest group of business students in the province. Three year co-op programs were developed in the early 1970s in a range of technology and business programs.  Humber became Canada's largest college with over 27,000 full-time and 50,000 part-time learners.

By the early 1980s Humber was developing programs to respond to business and industry demands by focusing on flexibility in class schedules, including a weekend College. Its skill-based training courses included self-paced programming and, along with Holland College in Prince Edward Island, became one of the National Centers for industry driven DACUM curriculum. Humber introduced flexible manufacturing and was a pioneer in introducing computer applications in technology programs. Lakeshore Campus, at its new permanent location on the lakeshore, was the first college to introduce a solar technology program to respond to the needs of that growing industry of the time. Humber had a large international outreach program, working in over 20 countries. With the assistance of ADB, the Government of Canada (CIDA), it developed the largest international program of all of the Canadian colleges by 1987, introducing the concept of responsive tertiary education to countries throughout Africa and Asia.

In 1983 the campus was used for filming of the first Police Academy film, which was released the following year.

After the mid-1980s, the college concentrated more on arts and applied arts programs and refocused its energy on internal processes rather than program innovation and on local rather than national or international activities. It is an Ontario Institute of Technology and Advanced Learning.

Academic Faculties

Faculty of Applied Sciences & Technology 
Faculty of Business 
Faculty of Media & Creative Arts
Faculty of Liberal Arts & Sciences and Innovative Learning 
Faculty of Social & Community Services
Faculty of Health Sciences & Wellness

Campuses

Humber North Campus
Located in northwest Toronto (formerly Etobicoke) adjacent to the Humber River, the Humber North Campus has approximately 20,000 full-time and 57,000 part-time students, 1,000 of them living in residence. The campus offers full-time and part-time programs in various fields including Business, Applied Technology, Health Sciences, Media Studies, Liberal Arts, Hospitality and Tourism. In addition to that, the campus also has an indoor pool and sauna, athletics facilities and a fully functioning spa. North Campus is home to the Funeral Service Education program, one of only two FSE programs offered in the province.

On April 18, 2015, Humber College opened Humber Learning Resource Commons (LRC) which serves as the new main entrance for the campus. The 264,000-square-foot building has six floors and features a student gallery and commons, a new library, enhanced student services, the Registrar’s Office, Student Recruitment, Student Success & Engagement, the International Centre, the School of Liberal Arts & Sciences and administrative offices. The building was designed by B+H Architects and it cost $79 million to build, $74.5 million of which were funded by Ministry of Training, Colleges and Universities.

The Donor Wall, located in the North Campus, was installed to acknowledge individuals and organizations whose cumulative contributions have reached or exceeded $10,000. The wall comprises a series of individual hexagonal tiles with four donor levels and integrated touch screens that provide a flexible, interactive component to student and teachers. As of March 2019, the wall displays more than 350 supporters who have donated to Humber since its opening in 1967.

The campus also includes University of Guelph-Humber, with a collaborative university-college partnership between the University of Guelph and Humber College.

Barrett Centre for Technology Innovation 
The Barrett Centre for Technology Innovation, located at Humber's North Campus, is home to many applied research projects with diverse partners across multiple sectors. It builds on Humber’s expertise in areas such as automation, robotics, systems integration, user experience testing, applied research and work-integrated learning. Some of the key features include interactive technology zones, digital media studios, cutting-edge prototyping and makerspaces, open concept gathering spaces and demonstration areas for new products and technologies. The 93,000 sq. ft. centre cost about $27 million, $10 million of which were funded by The Barrett Family Foundation. The Government of Canada provided additional funding of $15.5 million from the Post-Secondary Strategic Investment Fund, and the Government of Ontario provided $1.55 million from the College Equipment and Renewal Fund for the purchase of key equipment within the building.

Humber Lakeshore Campus
Located along the shores of Lake Ontario, at Kipling and Lake Shore Blvd. W, Humber's Lakeshore Campus located in New Toronto has approximately 7,200 full-time students, with 400 living in residence.  The Lakeshore Campus sits on the large grounds of the former Lakeshore Psychiatric Hospital and Lakeshore Teachers College, in the west-end New Toronto neighborhood of Toronto (formerly Etobicoke). When leased by Humber College, the college vowed to keep the historical site in good condition and enhance its park-like setting as an asset to the Southern Etobicoke community. The campus now consists of a number of cottage buildings and the more modern and now renovated Lakeshore Teachers College facilities that were extensively re-worked in the early 1980s. The L-Building was opened in 2011 at the Lakeshore Campus, as an addition to the cottages located around it. In May 2013, artist Harley Valentine's sculpture Persephone, after the mythic Greek queen of the underworld, was installed in the front plaza of the L-Building. The Lakeshore Campus was used as the location of the Police Academy in the 'Police Academy' film series.

Humber Arboretum
Located behind Humber College's North Campus, the Humber Arboretum consists of botanical gardens and natural areas surrounding the Humber River. This unique site is home to the Carolinian bioregion, the most diverse ecosystem in Canada, and boasts over 1,700 species of plants and animals.

Queensway Campus 
In 1968, Humber College opened Queensway 1 Campus which was located at 56 Queen Elizabeth Blvd; however, it was later renamed Lakeshore 2 Campus in 1975. It was home to Funeral Service Education Program which was launched for the first time in 1968/69 academic year. The campus closed its doors in 1989 and the program was moved to the North campus as part of the Health Sciences Division.

Other facilities 
On September 25, 2019, Humber College announced the decision to close its Orangeville campus at the end of June 2021 and launch a new International Graduate School in downtown Toronto.

The Humber Centre for Skilled Trades and Technology and the Humber Transportation Training Centre each operate from facilities near but separated from the North Campus, offering applied training in subjects such as construction trades and truck driving respectively.

Campus life

Athletics 
In 1968 Humber formally joined the Ontario College Athletic Association (OCAA). Humber started with just four varsity programs and endured the growing pains of a young athletic program. Since then the department has blossomed into one of the most dominant, not only in Ontario but in the nation. Humber has grown from four to twenty varsity teams, competing in every sport that the OCAA offers. The Hawks now have a men's and women's team in basketball, volleyball, outdoor soccer, indoor soccer, rugby, baseball/softball, golf, badminton, cross country and curling.

In the Fall of 2016, Humber Athletics became the first program to win 500 OCAA medals. Two years later, the Hawks captured their 50th Canadian Collegiate Athletic Association (CCAA) national championship, becoming the first institution to reach the milestone.

Humber also contains one of the college system's campus recreation programs. Campus Rec, as it is widely known, offers intramural and extramural teams as well as a number of off-campus events. Intramurals are on-campus leagues where students of various skill levels compete in sports ranging from soccer to ice hockey. Extramurals are competitive club teams formed at each college that compete against each other in a tournament league format. Campus Rec has recently introduced off-campus events where students can participate in leisurely excursions. These include mountain biking, skiing, curling, horseback riding, rock climbing, beach volleyball and the Time for War fitness course.

The fitness programs at Humber's North and Lakeshore Campuses offer students, faculty and community members a number of ways to stay fit and lead an active and healthy lifestyle. After a major renovation in 2010, the North Campus fitness area has become one of the area's finest. The facility has an aerobic studio, weight and cardio rooms, saunas, ping pong tables, showers, lockers and washrooms. Certified personal trainers are available to build programs, give guidance throughout workouts and help build nutritional guides. There are over 16 different classes offered ranging from extremely strenuous to light stretching depending on personal fitness level.

Clubs 

Ignite, previously known as the Humber Students' Federation club (HSF), is a sanctioned group of active and enthusiastic students who want to engage and share their passion or hobby with the students of Humber and Guelph-Humber. Clubs must be social, cultural or interest-based. Some of the clubs that were sanctioned for the 2013-2014 school year included Beyond the Rainbow, Dance Company, Liberals Club, Good Deeds Club, Embassy Christian Community, Table Tops Gaming Club, Ministry of Magic Club, and the Vietnamese Students' Association.

The overall purpose of Ignite is to meet new people who share the same interests and to enrich the post-secondary experience of Humber and Guelph-Humber students.

Residence 

Humber College offers residences for students at the North and Lakeshore Campuses. The North Residence is located by the Humber Arboretum and features three interlinked buildings with both single and suite-style rooms. The Lakeshore Residence is located west of downtown Toronto and offers suite-style rooms. Both residences offer themed floors which include extended quiet floors, single gender floors and Living and Learning Communities. Additional amenities include study rooms, a community kitchen that can be used for group cooking, exercise room (North only), recreational space and laundry facilities.

Humber's Residence Department also provides students with access to an online database of off-campus rental accommodations near both the Lakeshore and North campuses.

Student union 

IGNITE, formerly the Humber Students' Federation, is the official student government representing the full-time students at Humber College and the University of Guelph-Humber.  The elected students of IGNITE are members of key Humber committees to ensure that students are properly represented during all major discussions and decisions.

Outdoor Learning Lab 

Humber College has recently received funding to build an outdoor learning lab and naturalized play environment at one of its campus child care centres. The living lab will provide students and faculty in programs such as Early Childhood Education, Health and Fitness, and Sustainable Technology, with the opportunity to engage in meaningful studies of children's play and learning in a naturalized environment.

Facilities

Digital Broadcast Centre 
This centre is home to Humber TV, Radio Humber and all newspaper, magazine and web production. Humber is the only GTA College with a CRTC campus instructional license and fully operational radio station, 96.9 Radio Humber.

Arts and Media Studio 

The old Lakeshore Lions Arena at 300 Birmingham Street is now home to Humber's Arts and Media Studio, and opened in 2010. The site is part of the Lakeshore Campus site.

Centre for Urban Ecology 
The LEED gold certified building includes a green roof, passive solar heating and a biofilter system. It is the only Platinum EcoCentre in Ontario.

Recent achievements

On 25 January 2006, the French ambassador to Canada Daniel Jouanneau visited the North and Lakeshore campuses of Humber College. Jouanneau and school officials suggested the program might eventually be extended to the culinary arts and media-related programs, such as journalism.

On February 2, 2009, Humber College students became the first to contact an astronaut in orbit using an apparatus they built and operated.  They made contact with Sandra Magnus at the International Space Station from a lab room at the school's Rexdale campus.

On January 10, 2018, Humber College’s Lakeshore Campus is the first college in Ontario to receive Fair Trade Campus designation from the Canadian Fair Trade Network (CFTN.) for its promotion of social and environmental sustainability and innovation. Recognized already as one of Canada's Greenest Employers, achieving the designation is part of Humber’s five-year plan to make its campuses more sustainable.

On February 7, 2019, Humber College’s North Campus has received Fair Trade Campus designation from the Canadian Fair Trade Network for its promotion of social and environmental sustainability and innovation.

Notable alumni 

 Andres Arango, Canadian soccer player
 Nathan Fielder, comedian and actor
 Nicole Arbour, Internet personality
 Darren Barrett, Canadian jazz musician
 Herbert L. Becker (Applied and Creative Arts – Theatre/music 1975), Juno Award, author, actor, magician.
 Yolanda Bonnell, actress and playwright
 Ben Bowen, musician and songwriter
 Alysha Brillinger, Canadian jazz musician
 Michael A. Brown, Ontario politician
 Kayt Burgess, writer
 Tassie Cameron, Canadian television producer and writer
 Adam Copeland (Radio Broadcasting), actor, professional wrestler for the WWE, better known by his ring name "Edge"
 Royal Copeland, Canadian football player
 Anthony de Sa, novelist and writer
 Brian Dickinson (Applied and Creative Arts – Music), pianist
 Doug Ford, Premier of Ontario, attended for two months 
 C.B. Forrest, Canadian writer and poet
 Ajay Fry, television host, Innerspace
 Anne-Marie Green, news anchor
 Margaret Lindsay Holton, artist and author
 Mike Inglis, sports broadcaster
 Don Landry (Radio Broadcasting), former morning host on CJCL The Fan590, sportscaster, writer, and Toronto Argonauts stadium announcer
 Aaron Leaney, Canadian saxophonist, band leader, and composer
 Larnell Lewis, Canadian drummer, producer, and educator
 Shawn Little (Health Sciences), Ottawa City Council
 Gilson Lubin (Comedy), MTV Live
 Molly McGlynn, film and television director and screenwriter
 Donna McLeod, Georgia State Representative 
 Giacomo Gianniotti, Italian-Canadian actor
 Bev Oda, Canadian retired politician
 Nikki Payne, stand up comedian
 Jared Pelletier (Film Production), film director
 Renee Percy  (Comedy), writer and performer; winner of Phil Hartman Award
 Dina Pugliese, co-host of Breakfast Television
 Cara Ricketts, actress
 Sid Seixeiro, co-host of Breakfast Television
 Sidhu Moose Wala, Punjabi singer
 Eric Smith, sports journalist
 George Stroumboulopoulos (Radio Broadcasting, 1994),  host of George Stroumboulopoulos Tonight, host of CBC News: The Hour, former MuchMusic VJ
 Dione Taylor (Vocal Jazz), musician
 Elias Theodorou (Creative Advertising), professional mixed martial artist currently for the UFC
 Georgia Toews, Canadian novelist
 Francine Villeneuve (Horse Racing), first female Canadian thoroughbred jockey to win 1,000 races and former all-time winningest Canadian female
 Greg Wells (Applied and Creative Arts – Music), record producer
 Kurtis Conner, Canadian YouTuber
 K. Trevor Wilson, comedian

Arms

See also 
 Higher education in Ontario
 List of colleges in Ontario

References

External links 

 
 Official blog in Russian language

 
Colleges in Ontario
Educational institutions established in 1967
Education in Etobicoke
Universities and colleges in Toronto
1967 establishments in Ontario